Saga of the Shadow Lord is a 1986 adventure module for the Basic Rules of the Dungeons & Dragons fantasy role-playing game.

Plot summary

Saga of the Shadow Lord consists of two linked adventures as a mini-campaign:

In the first adventure called Elvenstar, player characters try to steal a magic item from the Shadow Lord to thwart his planned invasion of a peaceful neighboring kingdom. Encounters in this adventure include a village populated by adventurers, and a cloud giant living in a small castle, before the party reaches the Shadow Lord's lair for the final encounter.

In the second adventure, The Halls of Drax Tallen, the Shadow Lord returns more powerful than ever. His undead minions are searching for another magical item to give him immense power and the PCs must find this item before he does. An appendix follows this adventure giving details of four new magic items, and three new monsters.

Player characters must get past the undead army of the Shadow Lord and infiltrate his haunted fortress to retrieve the magical Elvenstar.

Publication history

X11 Saga of the Shadow Lord was published in 1986 as a 64-page booklet with an outer folder. It was written by Stephen Bourne with cover art by Keith Parkinson. The module features interior art by Mark Nelson. The scenario was written for the Expert Rules, for levels 5-9.

The module comes as a 64-page booklet wrapped in a three-section wraparound cover. It also includes maps along with monster and NPC statistics on the inside cover. The middle eight pages contain more maps, as well as eight pre-generated player characters.

Reception

Graeme Davis reviewed Saga of the Shadow Lord for White Dwarf #89. He stated that the Elvenstar adventure was designed in an old-fashioned style, with a series of fixed but random-seeming encounters along the way to a dungeon where the serious business takes place. He pointed out that the "village [was] packed with adventurers (of up to 7th level!)" and the "agoraphobic" cloud giant living in the "smallest castle [he's] ever seen", but felt that the "interesting encounter with the Shadow Lord's army lightens the otherwise fairly uninspiring zoo-dungeon journey until the adventurers reach the Shadow Lord's lair for the really serious dungeon-bashing". He noted some good aspects about the final encounter, particularly how the villains' tactics are outlined, as well as notes for the Dungeon Master on what to do next based on whether the PCs win, lose, or even miss the object of their quest. Davis considered The Halls of Drax Tallen repetitive, with the encounters "no more inspired than the first lot", and found "nothing staggeringly inventive or exciting" about the new magic items and monsters. Overall, Davis was disappointed by the module, as it gave him "the impression that no developments had taken place in the hobby in the last few years", with its "simple plot, lots of encounters and plenty of action, all firmly rooted in the original tradition of the game".Still, he conceded that "it does what it sets out to do perfectly adequately, and if an action-packed blood-and-thunder adventure without too much emphasis on plot and justification is your kind of thing, Saga of the Shadow Lords is worth looking at".

References

Dungeons & Dragons modules
Mystara
Role-playing game supplements introduced in 1986